The following is an episode list for the 1980s police television series Hunter, starring Fred Dryer and Stepfanie Kramer. In the United States, the show was aired on NBC. The "Pilot" TV movie premiered on September 18, 1984 with the series officially starting 10 days later. The show ended on April 26, 1991 after seven seasons. There are a total of 153 episodes, spanning seven years (1984–1991) of the show's run.

Reunion movies were broadcast on TV in 1995, 2002 and 2003, with a revival series of five episodes (of which only three aired) following in 2003 as well.

Series overview

Episodes

Season 1 (1984–85)

Season 2 (1985–86)

Season 3 (1986–87)

Season 4 (1987–88)

Season 5 (1988–89)

Season 6 (1989–90)

Season 7 (1990–91)

TV movies (1995–2003)

Revival series (2003)

References

External links 
 
  (revival)

Hunter